Carl De Keyzer (27 December 1958) is a Belgian photographer. Major subjects in his work have included the collapse of Soviet Union and India. He became a full member of Magnum Photos in 1994. De Keyzer has exhibited his work in many European galleries and has received several awards, including the Book Award from Rencontres d'Arles, the W. Eugene Smith Award and the Kodak Award.

Career
De Keyzer was born on 27 December 1958, in Kortrijk, Belgium. His freelance career began in 1982, at which time he also taught at the Royal Academy of Fine Arts, Ghent, Belgium. During this time, he co-founded the XYZ-Photography Gallery.

Major subjects in his work have included the collapse of Soviet Union and India. Robert Koch gallery describes his work as investigating "marginalized social groups and constructs uncritical psychological portraits which work to familiarize the 'other.'"

He was nominated to the Magnum Photos agency in 1990, became an associated member in 1992 and a full member in 1994. He currently lives in Ghent and continues to teach.

Publications
 Oogspanning, 1984,
 India, 1987 (Uitgeverig Focus 1999) 
 Homo Sovieticus/USSR-1989-CCCP, 1989 (Distributed Art Publishers 1993) ,
 God, Inc., 1992 (Uitgeverig Focus) 
 East of Eden. Ghent: Ludion, 1996. 
 Europa, 2000 (Ludion Editions NV) 
 Zona, 2003 (Trolley Books) 
 Trinity, 2008 (Schilt Publishing) 
 Congo (Belge) (Editions Lannoo sa) 
 Moments Before The Flood, 2012
 Higher Ground, 2016
 Cuba La Lucha, 2016
 DPR Korea Grand Tour, 2017

Awards

1982, First Prize – Experimental Film, Festival for Young Belgian Filmmakers, Brussels, Belgium
1986, Hasselblad Award Belgium, Brussels, Belgium
1986, Grand Prix de la Triennale de la photographie, Photographie Ouverte, Charleroi, Belgium
1988, Grand Prix de la Triennale de la Ville de Fribourg, Switzerland
1990, Louis Paul Boon Award, Ghent, Belgium
1990, Prix du Livre, Rencontres d'Arles, Arles, France
1990, W. Eugene Smith Award, New York City
1992, Paris
1995, Annual Fine Arts Award Belgium, Brussels, Belgium
2008, Shortlisted, Prix Pictet for Moments before the Flood

Collections

De Keyzer's work is held in the following collections:
Stedelijk Museum voor Actuele Kunst, Ghent, Belgium
Photography Museum, Charleroi, Belgium
Fotomuseum Antwerp, Antwerp, Belgium
Fnac Collection, Paris, France
Ministry of Culture, Brussels, Belgium
International Center of Photography, New York
Centro de Arte, Salamanca, Spain
Magnum Photos Collection, Harry Ransom Center, University of Texas at Austin

Exhibitions
Zona, Impressions Gallery, York, UK, 2005

References

External links

Magnum Photos; Photographers

1958 births
Living people
Magnum photographers
Belgian photographers
Photography in India
Photography in the Soviet Union